Oldřich Alfons Vašíček (born 1942) is a Czech mathematician and quantitative analyst, best known for his pioneering work on interest rate modelling; see Vasicek model.

Vašíček received his master's degree in math from the Czech Technical University, 1964, and a doctorate in probability theory from Charles University four years later.  After the Soviet invasion of Czechoslovakia in 1968, he defected to America, settled in San Francisco, and found employment in the management science department of Wells Fargo Bank in January 1969. In 1989 Stephen Kealhofer, John McQuown and Oldřich Vašíček founded company KMV. In 2002 the three entrepreneurs sold the company to Moody's for $210 million. In 2007, Moody's KMV was renamed to Moody's Analytics.

In 1970, Wells Fargo sponsored a conference that included Fischer Black and Myron Scholes, who had just begun thinking seriously about the problem of valuing stock options. Of course, their paper on that subject, timed so as to coincide with a related paper by Robert C. Merton, would revolutionize financial economics three years later. Even their preliminary thoughts at the 1970 conference excited Vašíček, who soon made related issues his own life's work.

Vašíček's own breakthrough paper, "An equilibrium characterization of the term structure"  describing the dynamics of the yield curve, appeared in the Journal of Financial Economics in 1977. The mean-reverting short-rate model he describes is commonly known as the Vasicek model. In recognition of that paper, and subsequent work, the International Association of Financial Engineers named Vašíček its IAFE/Sungard Financial Engineer of the Year, in 2004.

Vašíček has also received the Risk magazine Lifetime Achievement Award. He has been inducted into the Derivatives Strategy Hall of Fame, the Fixed Income Analysts Society Hall of Fame and the Risk Magazine Hall of Fame. Peter Carr, Head of Quantitative Financial Research at Bloomberg LP, included Vašíček's paper Probability of Loss on Loan Portfolio in the book Derivatives Pricing: The Classic Collection, which was marketed as a selection of 19 most influential papers on quantitative finance.

He plays the flute and is an avid windsurfer. He has three sons, one of whom is the screenwriter John Vasicek.

See also 
 Warsaw Pact invasion of Czechoslovakia

Notes 

1942 births
Living people
Financial economists
American people of Czech descent
Place of birth missing (living people)
Czech Technical University in Prague alumni
Czech mathematicians
People from Prague
Charles University alumni
Czech exiles
Czech emigrants to the United States